Cameron Legault (born September 25, 1974) is a former Canadian Football League defensive tackle who played for eight seasons for the Calgary Stampeders, BC Lions, Ottawa Renegades, and Winnipeg Blue Bombers. He won the 88th Grey Cup in 2000 as a member of the Lions. He played CIS football for the Carleton Ravens.

References

External links
Canadian Football League

1974 births
BC Lions players
Calgary Stampeders players
Canadian football defensive linemen
Carleton Ravens football players
Living people
Ottawa Renegades players
Players of Canadian football from Ontario
Canadian football people from Ottawa
Winnipeg Blue Bombers players